2009 Auckland Open was a darts tournament that took place in Auckland, New Zealand on 19 September 2009.

Results

Men

Women

References

2009 in darts
2009 in New Zealand sport
Darts in New Zealand
September 2009 sports events in New Zealand